Annabella Incontrera (11 June 1943 – 19 September 2004), sometimes credited as Pam Stevenson, was an Italian film and television actress.

Career 
Born in Milan, Incontrera attended the Centro Sperimentale di Cinematografia without finishing the course. She made her film debut at 16, in Love Now, Pay Later (L'inferno addosso, 1959), and appeared in about 40 films, mostly in secondary roles.

Personal life 
In 1969, she married Guglielmo Biraghi, film critic for the newspaper Il Messaggero, but they divorced a few years later.

She was romantically involved with the married British Labour Party politician Geoffrey Robinson, who in the 1970s was a businessman in charge of the Italian offshoot of British Leyland, and reputedly introduced to his colleagues as 'Signora Robinson'.

The actress suffered from a severe form of osteoporosis for years, and was forced to use a wheelchair.

Filmography 

Love Now, Pay Later (1959) – Micki
Maciste contro il vampiro (1961) – Magda
Una domenica d'estate (1962) – Lilly
L'uomo che bruciò il suo cadavere (1964)
Suicide Mission to Singapore (1966) – Evelyne
The Devil in Love (1966, directed by Ettore Scola) – Lucrezia
Poker with Pistols (1967, directed by Giuseppe Vari) – Lola
The Ambushers (1967) – Slaygirl
Quella carogna di Frank Mitraglia (1968) – Eva
A suon di lupara (1968) – Lucienne
The Assassination Bureau (1969) – Eleanora Spado
Une fille nommée Amour (1969) – Cécile, la soeur
Double Face (1969) – Liz
A Bullet for Sandoval (1969) – Carol Day
La sfida dei MacKenna (1970) – Maggie
Due ragazzi da marciapiede (1970) – Matilde
Commando di spie (1970) – Madeleine
Amore Formula 2 (1970) – Loreley
Le calde notti di Don Giovanni (1971) – Maddalena
I pirati dell'isola verde (1971) – Isabella
Return of Sabata (1971) – Maggie, Saloon Girl
Black Belly of the Tarantula (1971) – Mirta Ricci
Quando gli uomini armarono la clava e... con le donne fecero din don (1971) – Prehistoric woman (uncredited)
Roma Bene (1971, directed by Carlo Lizzani) – La Lesbica
Le belve (1971, episode Processo a porte chiuse) – Carmela Sparapaoli (segment "Processo a porte chiuse")
The Case of the Bloody Iris (1972) – Sheila Heindricks
So Sweet, So Dead (1972) – Franca Santangeli
Sette scialli di seta gialla (1972) – Helga Schurn
The Infamous Column (1972) – L'amante di Arconati
L'illazione (1972, directed by Lelio Luttazzi)
Il gatto di Brooklyn aspirante detective (1973) – Gravida De Porcaris
The Voyage (1974, directed by Vittorio De Sica) – Simona
Verginità (1974)
Ciak, si muore (1974) – Lucia
Paolo Barca, maestro elementare, praticamente nudista (1975)
Le braghe del padrone (1978) – Wife of Eugenio
Estigma (1980) – (final film role)

References

External links 
 

1943 births
Actresses from Milan
2004 deaths
Centro Sperimentale di Cinematografia alumni
Italian film actresses
Spaghetti Western actresses
20th-century Italian actresses